Middle Creek is a tributary of the Tahltan River, part of the Stikine River watershed in northwest part of the province of British Columbia, Canada. Middle Creek's watershed's land cover is classified as 45.2% shrubland, 30.8% conifer forest, 21.4% mixed forest, and small amounts of other cover.

Middle Creek is in the traditional territory of the Tahltan First Nation, of the Tahltan people.

Geography
From its source near Beatty Creek, Mansfield Creek, and the Little Tuya River, the creek flows generally south and through wetlands and a forested gorge to the Tahltan River. Middle Creek's main tributary, Riley Creek, joins near the mouth of Middle Creek.

See also
List of British Columbia rivers

References 

Cassiar Land District
Level Mountain
Nahlin Plateau
Rivers of British Columbia
Stikine Country
Tahltan